The Trafford Centre is a large indoor shopping centre and entertainment complex in Urmston, Greater Manchester, England. It opened in 1998 and is third largest in the United Kingdom by retail space.

Originally developed by the Peel Group, the Trafford Centre was sold to Capital Shopping Centres, later to become Intu, in 2011 for £1.65 billion setting a record as the costliest single property sale in British history.

The battle to obtain permission to build the centre was amongst the longest and most expensive in United Kingdom planning history.  the Trafford Centre had Europe's largest food court and the UK's busiest cinema.

History

Genesis

The site was owned by the Manchester Ship Canal Company which John Whittaker's Peel Holdings had been acquiring shares in since 1971 Manchester City Council also had a stake, but by the mid 1980s Whittaker had a majority control and proposed building an out-of-town shopping centre, and other schemes.

The council faced a conflict of interest as both a local planning authority and shareholder. Its minority shareholding also no longer gave it any real control over the company. Accordingly, in 1986 it surrendered the right to appoint all but one of the Manchester Ship Canal's directors, and sold its shares to Whittaker for £10 million.

Manchester City Council opposed Whittaker's proposal for retail development, stating it would impact negatively on the city centre economy, but accepted it was "obviously in the interests of the shareholders".

The application was called in by the Secretary of State for the Environment and legal disputes ensued requiring two public inquiries before planning permission was granted. Objections included congestion fears on the M60 motorway, and adverse consequences for retailers across Greater Manchester. Planning permission was granted in 1993 before being blocked by the Court of Appeal, then reinstated in 1995 by the House of Lords.

Twelve years after being proposed, the Trafford Centre opened on 10 September 1998. Construction had taken 27 months at a cost of £600 million. The Barton Square and Great Hall extensions opened in 2008, at a combined cost of over £100 million.

Intu

Peel Group sold the centre to Capital Shopping Centres (CSC) in January 2011 for £1.6 billion, in cash and shares, and John Whittaker, chairman of Peel Group, became deputy chairman of CSC. He later claimed he could have sold the centre for over £2 billion if he had been prepared to accept just cash. Nevertheless the £1.6 billion deal remained the largest property transaction in British history, and the biggest European property deal of 2011.

Capital Shopping Centres was renamed Intu in 2013 and spent £7 million rebranding the "Intu Trafford Centre".

, Intu claimed a fair market value of £2.312 billion for the centre. However, the firm entered administration in June 2020 and the centre was placed into receivership by its creditors in November 2020. In 2020, the Canada Pension Plan Investment Board, who had loaned Intu £250 million in 2017, exercised their rights as creditors to take ownership of the complex.

Post Intu

Construction of the Trafford Park Line Metrolink tram connection from the Trafford Centre to Manchester city centre via  began in 2016 and opened during 2020.

Building

John Whittaker, chose a lavish, unorthodox style seeking to avoid the centre rapidly appearing dated and stale, as so many United Kingdom shopping centres built in the 1960s and 1970s had become. Although the extravagant Rococo and Baroque design may be viewed as gaudy, he argued the prospect of the shopping centre rapidly ageing was mitigated.

The design was a collaboration between the architectural practices of Chapman Taylor and Manchester-based Leach Rhodes Walker. Main contractor was Bovis, with structural engineering services provided by WSP Group. Such was the size and detailing of the building, architects ended up producing over 3,000 separate shop drawings and the construction process required 24 chartered architects to work on the project full-time to monitor it.

Peel Avenue, Regent Crescent, the Dome, and The Orient, comprising the original centre were designed so that visitor flows split equally between their two floors. The Cinema and other leisure facilities are on the third floor, with the infrastructure for an additional fourth floor built ready during the initial construction.

There are three domed atria along the length of the mall, and the developers claim its £5 million middle dome is bigger than St Paul's Cathedral.

Decor

The Trafford Centre also contains eclectic Art Deco and Egyptian Revival elements. It is decorated primarily in shades of white, pink and gold with ivory, jade and caramel coloured marble throughout.

The marble floors and handrails are polished nightly to maintain the centre's opulence.

The Trafford Centre has decorative features such as red roses of Lancaster which pay homage to the local area and North West England. Griffin statues adorn the exterior, the heraldic symbol of the de Trafford baronets who historically owned much of the land in modern-day Trafford.

Elsewhere, fake palm trees and neo-classical decorative pillars made of painted, medium-density fibreboard have received criticism. Manchester architecture critic John Parkinson-Bailey described the Trafford Centre as a building which "will not appeal to purists" and the range of interior architecture as "bewildering".

Portraits around the walls of the mall depict members of the Whittaker family. A Mercedes car formerly belonging to John Whittaker's mother was initially displayed on the first floor mall outside  but is now in Trafford Palazzo.

Sculpture

A feature of the centre, and particularly Trafford Palazzo, is the statuary, fountains and other sculpture.  There are over 100 figures, mainly in a classical Greek / Roman, or Art Nouveau style.

Altrincham sculptor Colin Spofforth created bronze figures of a jazz band for the New Orleans theme, and the crest, above the main entrance. The latter assembles a griffin, unicorn and Roman centurion, once more referencing the arms of the de Trafford family. The centurion holds two lightning bolts, a reminder of the power stations formerly on the site.

The Orient

The Orient is Europe's largest food court with 1,600 seats and 35 retail outlets. It is decorated in the style of a 1930s ocean liner, incorporating detail representing China, New Orleans, Egypt, Italy, americana and Morocco. The two floors incorporate restaurants, bars and fast food outlets in sight of a giant screen.

Great Hall

The Great Hall opened 2007, its glazed structure housing five restaurants and cafes. Construction took 18 months at a cost of £26 million and incorporates a sweeping staircase with marble balustrades. The feature incorporates three internal maintenance walkways and weighs five ton.

Trafford Palazzo (formerly Barton Square)

The , covered Trafford Palazzo opened in 2008 and  cost £70 million. The former name referenced nearby Barton-upon-Irwell.

Trafford Palazzo is linked to the main Trafford Centre by a glazed bridge and incorporates a mock Italian renaissance square with fountain and campanile tower.

A £75 million renovation commenced in mid 2018 for Primark to open as an anchor tenant in 2020. The first floor extension created 110,000 sq ft of new retail floor space.

Leisure
Leisure facilities include a 20-screen cinema; Laser Quest arena; miniature golf; dodgems; bowling; arcade games and a Sea Life Centre aquarium.

Travel and transport

, 10 percent of the UK population lived within a 45-minute drive of the Trafford Centre.

Road
The Trafford Centre has 12,500 car spaces and 350 coach spaces and is off the M60 (Junctions 9 and 10). Its popularity has resulted in traffic congestion on the M60's Barton High-Level Bridge, requiring a link road adjacent to the M60 crossing the ship canal on a new lift bridge.

All vehicles entering the centre have number plate details recorded via automatic number plate recognition. Since its introduction in 2003 at a cost of £220,000 the system has reduced the number of thefts of and from vehicles to a level described as "negligible". The ANPR tracks cars which have been used for serious offences and details of any car with such a number plate can then be passed to Stretford Police Station.

Bus
There is a bus station at the west end of the Trafford Centre with services to most towns in Greater Manchester.

Tram

The centre is served by two stops in the Trafford Park Line of the Manchester Metrolink network. The terminating Trafford Centre tram stop serves the west of the centre while the Barton Dock Road tram stop serves the east of the centre and Trafford Palazzo.

Until 2020, the nearest Metrolink stop to the site was Stretford, and a shuttle bus had connected the two.

In popular culture

 The setting for Shopping City on BBC Two.
 Featured in 2008 BBC documentary series, Britain From Above, highlighted a transition from industry to services.
 The Orient food court was used as a location in the 2008 post-apocalyptic drama Survivors.
 Focal point of BBC's 2010 The Apprentice week 5 when contestants sold clothes.
 The Lancashire Hotpots song Trafford Centre is about christmas shopping at the centre.

See also
 Trafford Waters
 List of shopping centres in the United Kingdom
 Manchester Arndale
 Economy of Manchester

References

External links

 

The Peel Group
Shopping centres in Greater Manchester
Buildings and structures in Trafford
Shopping malls established in 1998
Trafford Centre#Bus